Serket, The Arachnological Bulletin of the Middle East and North Africa, is a biannual peer-reviewed  scientific journal on arachnology. It was established in August 1987 in Egypt, taking its name from the ancient Egyptian for a scorpion.

Abstracting and indexing 
The journal is abstracted and indexed in:
 Entomology Abstracts
 Industrial and Applied Microbiology Abstracts
 Virology and AIDS Abstracts
 The Zoological Record

References

External links 
 

Arachnology journals
Biannual journals
Publications established in 1987
English-language journals